USSF may refer to:
 United States Army Special Forces, a special operations forces unit of the U.S. Army
 United States Servicemen's Fund, a support organization for soldier and sailor resistance to the Vietnam War and the U.S. military
 United States Soccer Federation, governing body of soccer in the United States
 United States Social Forum, activist organization
 United States Space Force, the space service branch of the United States Armed Forces
 US Sumo Federation, governing body of sumo in the United States

See also
 USSC (disambiguation)
 SF (disambiguation)